Hamza Demir (born 1956) is a Swedish politician and former member of the Riksdag, the national legislature. A member of the Left Party, he represented Västra Götaland County West between November 2017 and September 2018.

References

1956 births
Living people
Members of the Riksdag 2014–2018
Members of the Riksdag from the Left Party (Sweden)